Teluk Intan may refer to:

 Teluk Intan (town), Hilir Perak, Perak, Malaysia
 Teluk Intan (federal constituency), Perak, Malaysia
 Teluk Intan Hospital, Teluk Intan, Hilir Perak, Perak, Malaysia
 SMS Teluk Intan (SEMESTI, Teluk Intan Science Secondary School), Perak, Malaysia; a secondary school

See also

 Leaning Tower of Teluk Intan, a clock tower in Teluk Intan, Hilir Perak, Perak, Malaysia
 Teluk
 Intan (disambiguation)